The Battle of Huliaipole is an ongoing military conflict between the Armed Forces of Russia and the Armed Forces of Ukraine in the city of Huliaipole, in central Zaporizhzhia Oblast.

Battle

March
During the course of the Southern Ukraine offensive of the 2022 Russian invasion of Ukraine, Huliaipole lost power and water from 2 March 2022. The following day, Russian forces captured the nearby city of Polohy. On 5 March, Russian forces briefly entered Huliaipole.

On 15 March, the Russian Armed Forces were conducting combat operations around Huliaipole. A Ukrainian missile division led by  struck back at the Russian forces near Huliaipole, but on 18 March, Vasyliev was fired upon by Russian forces and died from his injuries the day after. He was posthumously awarded the Order of the Gold Star, which was presented to his wife and child by President Volodymyr Zelenskyy. On 26 March, the Zaporizhzhia regional military administration claimed Ukrainian forces had recaptured the villages of Poltavka and Malynivka east of Huliaipole after heavy fighting.

By 30 March, Huliaipole had experienced almost a month of nightly shelling, while its population had decreased to around 2,000, with around a dozen civilian deaths.

April
On 21 April, three Russian helicopters were shot down over Huliaipole by a Ukrainian man-portable air-defense system, forcing a nearby Russian tank column to retreat, while Ukrainian long range artillery also destroyed 24 Russian tanks and 10 APCs in the area around the city. Serhiy Yarmak, the mayor of Huliaipole, reported that local Ukrainian forces had named their defensive positions after Nestor Makhno, a native of Huliaipole that fought in the Ukrainian War of Independence.

On 25 April, the Russian forces began concentrating their efforts on capturing Huliaipole, reinforcing their own positions and firing on Ukrainian ones. The following day, three people were wounded and a number of houses destroyed during a Russian artillery bombardment, which continued for a number of days. The provincial government of Zaporizhzhia later reported that Russian troops in the area were shooting their own cars, in order to not get sent to the front at Huliaipole, and that they were also complaining about the ineffectiveness that their attacks had on the Territorial Defense Forces.

May
On 6 May, the Russian forces began to shell the city with artillery and airstrikes. In response to the shelling, Serhiy Yarmak ordered an evacuation of the town's residents. On 14 May, it was reported that many residential buildings had been damaged or destroyed during the continued bombardment, an act which the Security Service of Zaporizhzhia considered to be a war crime. Russian forces also destroyed the road between the Ukrainian-held Huliaipole and the Russian-held city of Polohy, using land mines. That same day, Serhii Parkhomenko, a commander in the 229th Tactical Aviation Brigade, was shot down and killed near Huliaipole. He was posthumously awarded the title "Hero of Ukraine", which was presented to his family by President Volodymyr Zelenskyy.

On 28 May, the 45th Separate Artillery Brigade of the Ukrainian Armed Forces published a video documenting the artillery bombardment of Russian forces, which were reportedly looting a hamlet near Huliaipole.

June
In June, Russian forces deployed multiple rocket launchers to shell Huliaipole's remaining civilian infrastructure. Oleksandr Starukh, the governor of Zaporizhzhia Oblast, reported that the Ukrainian defensive line was being reinforced at Huliaipole, where clashes were still ongoing. On 7 June, a 10 year-old child was wounded in a Russian artillery strike against Huliaipole.

On 9 June, the Chief Intelligence Directorate of the Ukrainian Ministry of Defence reported that the bodies of Russian soldiers who died fighting in Huliaipole had been taken to a meat packing plant in Russian-occupied Melitopol, and accused the Russian government of downplaying the number of casualties. The Chief Intelligence Directorate also revealed that they had attempted to break the siege of Mariupol in early April, but the detachment sent from Huliaipole to break into the city was repelled by the Russian defensive line.

On 13 June, the Russian Air Force launched a series of airstrikes against Ukrainian positions at Huliaipole. The Russian armed forces reportedly continued to target civilian infrastructure, rather than directly engaging Ukrainian forces. According to the General Staff of the Ukrainian Armed Forces, this continued bombardment was being carried out in order to pin down the Ukrainian forces in Huliaipole, as part of an attempt by Russian forces to capture the city of Sievierodonetsk. Mortars, artillery and multiple rocket launchers were fired against Ukrainian positions in Huliaipole by Russian forces, but the Ukrainians were able to repel the Russian offensive. Small gains were made by the Ukrainian forces in the area around Huliaipole, although this came at a high personnel cost, with many Ukrainians being injured in the artillery fire.

On 18 June, shelling against Huliaipole continued, damaging several residential and commercial buildings, and wounding a number of civilians. On 28 June, in order to pin down Ukrainian forces as part of the Russian offensive against Lysychansk, Russian forces bombarded Ukrainian positions in Huliaipole.

July
On 5 July, the Zaporizhzhia Regional Military Administration reported continued Russian missile attacks against civilian infrastructure in Huliaipole. On 10 July, the General Staff of the Ukrainian Armed Forces also reported sustained Russian artillery attacks on Huliaipole. Following Russian missile attacks against Huliaipole on 12 July, the National Police of Ukraine reported that cluster bombs had exploded in nearby agricultural fields and burnt down over 600 hectares of grain. Although the Russian Armed Forces were not conducting any further offensive operations in Zaporizhzhia, they continued to shell Huliaipole. 

On 19 July, the Russian Armed Forces began regrouping their troops in Zaporizhzhia and started concentrating their efforts on capturing the region. That date, Russian forces shelled Huliaipole using a BM-21 Grad multiple rocket launcher system and artillery, causing damage to a number of administrative and residential buildings, and reportedly leaving a number of casualties, with the State Emergency Service of Ukraine putting out fires in the aftermath. On 21 July, Serhiy Yarmak reported that over 1,000 homes and nearly all of the town's infrastructure had been damaged during the months of heavy shelling. Russian forces continued to shell civilian and military infrastructure in Huliaipole into August, but did not take any further military actions in the area.

August

On 12 August, the General Staff of the Ukrainian Armed Forces reported that Russian forces had opened fire against Ukrainian positions at Huliaipole, but they were repelled. As part of their effort to advance towards Zaporizhzhia, Russian forces then conducted aerial reconnaissance near Huliaipole. Further shelling of Huliaipole was reportedly conducted by Russian tanks and artillery, which were subsequently followed by airstrikes. Sustained bombardment of Huliaipole by Russian artillery and airstrikes resulted in the destruction of a sports complex on 22 August. On the night of 28 August, a Russian Kh-22 missile reportedly struck a housing community in the regional capital of Zaporizhzhia, where a number of Huliaipole residents had been sheltering after fleeing their home city. Meanwhile, the Ukrainian General Staff reported on the continuation of Russian airstrikes against Huliaipole. The Russian air force also carried out reconnaissance around Huliaipole, using unmanned aerial vehicles.

September

On 1 September, Russian forces shelled Huliaipole with tanks and artillery, in attacks which continued as a number of Russian military personnel on the Zaporizhzhia front were killed by the Ukrainian Armed Forces. On 5 September, the Military Administration of Zaporizhzhia Oblast reported that Russian forces had been firing on Huliaipole's civilian infrastructure, while concentrating their main efforts on holding their own positions. Although not taking offensive operations on the Zaporizhzhia front, Russian shelling of Huliaipole's civilian infrastructure persisted, with reports indicating that civilians had been injured and one killed in the bombardment. On 24 September, Ukrainian artillery units in Huliaipole destroyed 10 pieces of Russian weapons systems, but Russian shelling of the city was able to continue the following day. According to Oleksandr Starukh, on 28 September, Russian forces fired three S-300 missiles at the city centre, destroying a historical building, damaging a road and causing an unconfirmed number of casualties.

October

Russian forces did not conduct active offensive operations against Huliaipole at the beginning of October, but continued to shell the city, inflicting fire damage, using artillery, mortars and tanks. According to Zaporizhzhia Governor Oleksandr Starukh, the Russian shelling killed Huliaipole's deputy mayor Oleksandr Savytskyi and the local utility service director Oleksandr Kosarenko, who reportedly died at their workplaces. Following the shelling, on 4 October, the Ukrainian Air Force responded by striking back at Russian positions near Huliaipole, destroying some military equipment. Russian artillery and rocket attacks continued in the following days. 

The following day, the Ukrainian Armed Forces carried out strikes against the Russian positions south of Huliaipole, reportedly hitting military equipment and injuring dozens of Russian soldiers. On 19 October, Oleksandr Starukh reported that Russian S-300 missiles had been fired on the city itself, destroying another school without causing any casualties.

On 28 October, Russian forces fired again on Ukrainian military positions and civilian infrastructure in Huliaipole. The shelling particularly targetted residential homes, reportedly causing fire damage.

November
On 4 November, Russian forces continued to shell Huliaipole, using tanks, mortars and artillery. The following day, Ivan Fedorov gave an interview with Ukrinform, in which he claimed that detained residents of Melitopol were being used by the Russian military occupation to dig trenches around Huliaipole. On 7 November, Oleksandr Starukh reported that Russian forces had fired S-300 missiles at a village near Huliaipole, damaging a cultural center and a farm warehouse, along with some homes. The following day, Huliaipole was shelled again with artillery. On 10 November, while the artillery shelling of Huliaipole continued, the Ukrainian General Staff reported that Russian forces were starting to fortify their positions in the occupied areas of the Zaporizhzhia region, using civilians to help with the construction. The following day, Russian forces carried out missile strikes against civilian infrastructure in Huliaipole, reportedly destroying houses. On 12 November, Ivan Fedorov reported that the 115th Separate Melitopol Battalion of the Territorial Defense Forces had destroyed 4 Russian armored personnel carriers near Huliaipole.

The artillery shelling of Huliaipole continued through the following week, damaging houses and civilian infrastructure, as part of an attempt by Russian forces to defend their frontlines through the Zaporizhzhia region. On 18 November, the Ukrainian Armed Forces responded by carrying out strikes against Russian positions along the contact line, wounding more than 100 soldiers and destroying 20 pieces of military equipment. On 21 November, Petro Andriushchenko reported that the movement of Russian military equipment and manpower from Mariupol had changed direction towards Huliaipole, confirming that two large military convoys had moved towards the city through Nikolske. The shelling of Ukrainian military positions and civilian infrastructure in Huliaipole continued over the subsequent days, as the Russian armed forces started to conduct active defensive operations in the area.

Having faced constant shelling for eight months, the coming winter also became a concern for the people of Huliaipole, which was beginning to face negative temperature. As the city no longer had electricity, food was cooked over open fires and water was drawn from wells. Volunteer aid workers distributed warm clothing and food to the locals, who Reuters reported were sheltering from the shelling together in cramped basements. Huliaipole and Orikhiv have both received aid packages from non-governmental organization such as Slava Ukraini, whose volunteers came under mortar fire during one of their dispatches.

December
Following a successful counteroffensive that had resulted in the capture of Kherson by Ukrainian forces, attentions began to shift towards a possible offensive in Zaporizhzhia. Since the capture of Kherson, Russian helicopter activity around Huliaipole became more frequent and artillery shelling of Ukrainian positions at Huliaipole intensified, as Russian military equipment was moved towards the city. In the first week of December, increased Russian artillery fire on Huliaipole was recorded, as the Russian forces attempted to improve their tactical position in the area. The Ukrainian General Staff reported that the strikes on the city had inflicted fire damage. Artillery shelling against Huliaipole continued the following week, while Russian tanks were deployed to the region. 

On 9 December, Russian and Ukrainian forces at Huliaipole exchanged artillery fire, in response to what Russian intelligence reported to be a massing of Ukrainian mechanized infantry around the city, prompting further speculation of a Ukrainian offensive in the region. On 11 December, Russian troops attacked the city, reportedly damaging critical civil infrastructure and wounding at least two civilians, according to Oleksandr Starukh. The following day, UNESCO reported that a cultural center and a Kingdom Hall were among the cultural sites in Huliaipole that were damaged by the Russian attacks. Russian artillery shelling continued over the subsequent week, further damaging civilian infrastructure. Russian forces also began massing troops around Melitopol, in response to the increasing Ukrainian numbers around Huliaipole.

January
Artillery shelling of Huliaipole continued into 2023, as the Russian forces continued to hold defensive positions in Zaporizhzhia Oblast. By this point in time, the remaining civilian population of the city was about 2,300 people, who endured daily shelling by Russian forces. On 7 January, during the Russian-proposed "Christmas truce", approximately 230 shells hit the city. The bombardment of the city continued through the subsequent week. During the shelling on 12 January, fire damage was inflicted on multiple houses and a 73-year-old resident of the city was killed. 

Having remained largely on the defensive for the first weeks of the year, on 18 January, the Russian forces attempted an offensive against Orikhiv and Huliaipole, but were unsuccessful. Russian forces subsequently continued to shell the city with artillery and missile strikes. On 20 January, Oleksandr Starukh reported that the Russian shelling had damaged a number of houses and killed a woman in Huliaipole.

As missile strikes and artillery bombardment of Huliaipole continued, Vladimir Rogov announced that Russian troops were moving towards Orikhiv and Huliaipole as part of a general offensive in Zaporizhzhia Oblast. Ukrainian armed forces repelled the offensive, with Russian officials claiming that their advance had stalled. Reports indicate that Russian forces managed to seize a previously-occupied strip of "no-man's land" closer to the cities, although Ukrainian forces reported no large-scale assault in the area.

Artillery shelling of Huliaipole continued into the final week of January, resulting in the destruction of homes and school buildings. Huliaipole's synagogue  was also damaged in a Russian missile attack. This prompted condemnation from Israeli politician Ze'ev Elkin, whose family is originally from the city, as well as Ukraine's Chief Rabbi Moshe Reuven Azman.

February
As Russian forces began to regroup and reportedly prepared for a new offensive, they continued shelling Huliaipole during the first week of February. On 10 February, the Russian forces stationed at Tokmak fired a number of S-300 missiles at Ukrainian-held Zaporizhzhia Oblast, targetting civilian energy infrastructure. They then continued artillery shelling of Huliaipole during the second week of February, damaging civilian infrastructure. Artillery shelling of Huliaipole continued into the third week of February and through towards the end of the month, causing fire damage. 

On the 1-year anniversary of the invasion, Russian forces launched attacks against the Ukrainian-held areas of the Zaporizhzhia front, but were repelled. Russian shelling of Huliaipole subsequently continued, with air strikes, missile attacks, and artillery bombardment, again causing fire damage. Throughout the shelling of the contact line, the Russian armed forces remained on the defensive.

Throughout the attacks against Huliaipole, aid agencies under the United Nations Office for the Coordination of Humanitarian Affairs (UNOCHR) sent supply convoys to the city, bringing relief supplies including water bottles, as the city had been lacking drinking water since the war began.

References

Huliaipole
March 2022 events in Ukraine
April 2022 events in Ukraine
May 2022 events in Ukraine
June 2022 events in Ukraine
July 2022 events in Ukraine
August 2022 events in Ukraine
September 2022 events in Ukraine
October 2022 events in Ukraine
November 2022 events in Ukraine
Southern Ukraine campaign
History of Zaporizhzhia Oblast
December 2022 events in Ukraine
Huliaipole
January 2023 events in Ukraine